Herringswell is a village and civil parish in the West Suffolk district of Suffolk in eastern England. In 2005 it had a population of 190. In 2007 there were 128 voters there. 

History
In 2006 a village council successfully opposed the development of a proposed stadium, Watermark, by combining its advocacy with those of four surrounding communities.

Composition

Herringswell Manor is located in the community. Abbot of Bury St Edmunds originally owned the land, and by the early 20th century it was the country house of a Blackheath, London family, of businessperson Arthur Ballance and his wife's family, the Peeks. The Ballances/Peeks lived in the mock-Tudor manor house built in 1901. 
In 1965 The property was bought for £35,000 to be an American-style-curriculum boarding school for children of U.S. & Canadian families who were working internationally.  
In 1981 the property was sold to Bhagwan Shree Rajneesh ashram. Herringswell residents formed a council when they deemed the ashram to be gaining too much influence. The Shi-Tennoji School in UK, a Japanese Buddhist boarding school, was in operation there beginning in 1985 and ending on 17 July 2000. The former campus includes the Herringswell Manor, built in 1901. The school closed due to declining student figures. The manor house as well as the other buildings on the property have now been converted into flats.

References

External links

Herringswell Parish Council

Villages in Suffolk
Forest Heath
Civil parishes in Suffolk